The 1962 Masters Tournament was the 26th Masters Tournament, held April 5–9 at Augusta National Golf Club in Augusta, Georgia. Arnold Palmer won the third of his four Masters titles in the tournament's first three-way playoff. It was the fifth of his seven major titles.

The other two in the 18-hole Monday playoff were also major championship winners: defending champion Gary Player and Dow Finsterwald, winner of the PGA Championship in 1958. Out in 37 and down three strokes to Player at the turn, Palmer shot a 31 on the back nine for 68, while Player shot a 71 and Finsterwald a 77. In the lead after three rounds, Palmer was five-over for his final round after a double bogey at the 10th hole. After five pars, he birdied 16 and 17 to get into the Monday playoff with a 75 (+3). The gallery for the playoff was estimated at 16,000 spectators.

Henry Picard, the 1938 champion, made his final cut at Augusta at age 55. Jack Nicklaus, 22, tied for 15th in his fourth appearance, the first as a professional. He won the next major, the U.S. Open, in a playoff over Palmer at Oakmont near Pittsburgh.

With near misses in 1959 and 1961, Palmer said that it could have been his fifth consecutive title at Augusta.

The 36-hole cut was increased this year to include the low 44 plus ties and anyone within 10 shots of the lead (previously it was the low 40 plus ties). 110 players entered the tournament and 52 made the cut at 149 (+5).

Bruce Crampton won the third Par 3 contest with a score of 22.

Field
1. Masters champions
Jack Burke Jr. (4,8), Jimmy Demaret, Doug Ford (4,9,10,11), Claude Harmon, Ben Hogan (2,3,4,9), Herman Keiser, Cary Middlecoff (2), Byron Nelson (2,4), Arnold Palmer (2,3,8,9,10,11), Henry Picard (4), Gary Player (3,9), Gene Sarazen (2,3,4), Horton Smith, Sam Snead (3,4,8), Art Wall Jr. (10,11)
Ralph Guldahl (2) and Craig Wood (2) did not play.

The following categories only apply to Americans

2. U.S. Open champions
Tommy Bolt (8), Julius Boros, Billy Burke, Billy Casper (8,11), Jack Fleck, Ed Furgol, Gene Littler (8,9,10,11), Tony Manero, Lloyd Mangrum, Dick Mayer (8), Fred McLeod, Sam Parks Jr., Lew Worsham (8)

3. The Open champions
Jock Hutchison (4), Denny Shute (4)

4. PGA champions
Jerry Barber (10,11), Walter Burkemo (8), Jim Ferrier, Dow Finsterwald (9,11), Vic Ghezzi, Chick Harbert, Chandler Harper, Jay Hebert (11), Lionel Hebert, Johnny Revolta, Bob Rosburg (8), Jim Turnesa

5. U.S. Amateur and Amateur champions
Deane Beman (6,8,a), Dick Chapman (a), Charles Coe (6,8,a), Ed Updegraff (a)

6. Members of the 1961 U.S. Walker Cup team
Gene Andrews (a), Don Cherry (a), Bob Cochran (a), Robert W. Gardner (8,a), Bill Hyndman (a), Billy Joe Patton (a), Charlie Smith (7,a)

Bud Taylor did not play. Patton was first reserve for the team. Nicklaus had turned professional but qualified under other categories.

7. 1961 U.S. Amateur quarter-finalists
Sam Carmichael (a), Gene Francis (a), Marion Methvin (a), Richard Norville (a), Dudley Wysong (a)

8. Top 24 players and ties from the 1961 Masters Tournament
Bill Collins (11), Paul Harney, Fred Hawkins, Don January (10), Ted Kroll (10), Jack Nicklaus (9), Johnny Pott (10), Doug Sanders (9,10), Ken Venturi

9. Top 16 players and ties from the 1961 U.S. Open
Jacky Cupit, Gardner Dickinson, Dave Douglas, Al Geiberger, Bob Goalby, Eric Monti, Mike Souchak (11)

10. Top eight players and ties from 1961 PGA Championship
Wes Ellis

11. Members of the U.S. 1961 Ryder Cup team

12. Two players selected for meritorious records on the fall part of the 1961 PGA Tour
George Bayer, Gay Brewer

13. One player, either amateur or professional, not already qualified, selected by a ballot of ex-Masters champions
Dave Marr

14. One professional, not already qualified, selected by a ballot of ex-U.S. Open champions
Billy Maxwell

15. One amateur, not already qualified, selected by a ballot of ex-U.S. Amateur champions
R. H. Sikes (a)

16. Two players, not already qualified, from a points list based on finishes in the winter part of the 1962 PGA Tour
Dave Ragan, Phil Rodgers

17. Foreign invitations
Ben Arda, Al Balding, David Blair (a), Antonio Cerdá (8), Bob Charles, Gary Cowan (a), Bruce Crampton, Fidel de Luca, Roberto De Vicenzo (8), Gerard de Wit, Bruce Devlin, Juan Antonio Estrada (a), José Maria Gonzalez, Mário Gonzalez, Tom Haliburton, Harold Henning, Denis Hutchinson, Stan Leonard (8), Sebastián Miguel, Ángel Miguel, Kel Nagle (3), Frank Phillips, Chi-Chi Rodríguez, Leopoldo Ruiz, Miguel Sala, Syd Scott, Norman Von Nida, Brian Wilkes

Numbers in brackets indicate categories that the player would have qualified under had they been American.

Round summaries

First round 
Thursday, April 5, 1962

Source

Second round 
Friday, April 6, 1962

Source

Third round 
Saturday, April 7, 1962

Final round 
Sunday, April 8, 1962

Final leaderboard

Sources:

Scorecard 
Final round

Cumulative tournament scores, relative to par
{|class="wikitable" span = 50 style="font-size:85%;
|-
|style="background: Pink;" width=10|
|Birdie
|style="background: PaleGreen;" width=10|
|Bogey
|style="background: Green;" width=10|
|Double bogey
|}

Playoff 
Monday, April 9, 1962

Source:

Scorecard 

Source:

References

External links 
 Masters.com – Past winners and results
 Augusta.com – 1962 Masters leaderboard and scorecards

1962
1962 in golf
1962 in American sports
1962 in sports in Georgia (U.S. state)
April 1962 sports events in the United States